Heimo Vorderegger (born June 3, 1966) is a football manager and former Austrian football defender.

Honours

 Austrian Cup winner: 2000-01
 Austrian Supercup winner: 2001
 Austrian Football First League winner: 2000-01

External links
 

1966 births
Living people
Association football defenders
Austrian footballers
SK Austria Klagenfurt players
SKN St. Pölten players
FC Kärnten players
BSV Bad Bleiberg players
FC St. Veit players
Sportspeople from Villach
Footballers from Carinthia (state)
SK Austria Klagenfurt managers
Austrian football managers